At , Harriman State Park is the second largest state park in New York State. The park is also known for its 31 lakes, multiple streams, public camping area, and great vistas. The park's hiking trails are currently maintained by volunteers from the New York - New Jersey Trail Conference.

On its northeastern edge, Harriman State Park borders the  Bear Mountain State Park as well as the United States Military Academy's  forest reserve. To the southwest, it partly borders the state-owned  Sterling Forest reserve.

History

Edward Harriman and Mary Averell Harriman owned  in Arden, New York as part of their estate. They opposed the state's decision to build a prison at Bear Mountain and wanted to donate some of their land to the state in order to build a park. A year after the death of her husband in 1909, Mary Harriman proposed to Governor Charles Evans Hughes that she would donate  of land and $1 million for the creation of a new state park. As part of the deal, the state would do away with the plan to build the prison, appropriate an additional $2.5 million to acquire additional land and construct park facilities. The Palisades Interstate Park Commission would have its authority extended north into the Ramapo Mountains and the Hudson Highlands, and New Jersey would also contribute an amount of money deemed reasonable by the Commission. The state agreed and on October 29, 1910, W. Averell Harriman presented a deed for the land and a million-dollar check to the Commission.

In 1913, Major William A. Welch started construction on the road from Bear Mountain to Sloatsburg, known today as the Seven Lakes Drive. In 1962 a new road from the Southfields section of Tuxedo to Kanawake Circle was opened. There were also numerous other roads completed around Bear Mountain and Dunderberg Mountain in order to make it easier for people to reach the new park. In addition, there was steamboat service from Manhattan offering round-trip tickets for 85 cents for adults and 45 cents for children.

The park received a large influx of free labor during the Great Depression. The Civilian Conservation Corps (CCC) offered thousands of young men work such as building roads, trails, camps and lakes. Projects completed by the CCC in the park included Pine Meadow, Wanoksink, Turkey Hill, Welch, Silvermine and Massawippa Lakes.  In 1993, the World Orienteering Championships were held at Harriman State Park.

Trails

There are more than forty marked hiking trails ( total) in Harriman, and another 57 unmarked trails and woods road (foot traffic only). Some of the better known trails include the following:

 Appalachian Trail,  are within the park
 Blue Disc Trail, 2.8 miles (4.5 km)
 Long Path,  are within the park
 Pine Meadow Trail, 
 Ramapo-Dunderberg Trail, 
 Red Cross Trail, 
 Seven Hills Trail, 
 Suffern-Bear Mountain Trail, 
 Timp-Torne Trail, 
 Tuxedo-Mt Ivy Trail, 
 White Bar Trail, 

In addition to the hiking trails there are a number of horse trails in the southeastern portion of the park and a mountain bike trail at the Anthony Wayne Recreation Area in the northeast of the park. In winter some of the trails are open for cross-country skiing. The hiking trails are maintained by the New York - New Jersey Trail Conference.

Environment
The park lies within the Northeastern coastal forests ecoregion.

Lakes

There are 32 lakes and ponds in Harriman. Some of the larger ones are:

 Lake Sebago, ,boat launch, cabin camping
 Lake Tiorati, ,swimming beach, boat launch
 Lake Welch, swimming beach, camping
 Lake Kanawauke (lower, middle and upper), 
 Lake Stahahe, 
 Silver Mine Lake, 
 Pine Meadow Lake, 
 Turkey Hill Lake, 
 Island Pond, 
 Lake Askoti, 
 Lake Skanatati, 
 Lake Wanoksink, 
 Lake Skenonto, 
 Queensboro Lake, 
 Hessian Lake, 
 Summit Lake,

Parkways and park roads
The following parkways exist within the park;

 Palisades Interstate Parkway
 Seven Lakes Drive
 Long Mountain Parkway
 Lake Welch Parkway
 Tiorati Brook Road
 Arden Valley Road
 Orange-Rockland CR 106

See also
 Bear Mountain State Park
 List of New York state parks
 New York–New Jersey Trail Conference

References

 Myles, William J., Harriman Trails, A Guide and History, The New York-New Jersey Trail Conference, New York, 1999.
 50 Hikes in the Lower Hudson Valley—Written by New York-New Jersey Trail Conference members Stella Green and H. Neil Zimmerman, The Countryman Press. 296 pages, 2008, 2nd ed.

External links

 New York State Parks: Harriman State Park
 Palisades Interstate Park Commission: Harriman State Park
 New York-New Jersey Trail Conference: Harriman-Bear Mountain State Parks
 Harriman Hikers

 
Civilian Conservation Corps in New York (state)
Parks in Orange County, New York
Parks in Rockland County, New York
Protected areas of the Hudson Highlands
Ramapos
State parks of New York (state)